State Route 129 (SR 129) is a 49.22 mile long east-west state highway in the hills of southern Middle Tennessee.

Route description

SR 129 begins in Giles County in Waco at an intersection with US 31/SR 7. It goes east to pass through Lynnville before passing through farmland in a narrow valley to cross into Marshall County. The highway then has an interchange with I-65 (Exit 27) before winding its way hilly terrain to enter Cornersville and coming to an intersection with US 31A/SR 11. SR 129 becomes concurrent with US 31A/SR 11 and they turn south along Main Street to pass through town before SR 129 splits off and goes east through farmland to have an intersection with SR 272 in Archer. It then enters Petersburg, where it has short concurrencies with US 431/SR 50 and SR 130. The highway crosses into Lincoln County in downtown at the split with SR 130. SR 129 passes through town along Railroad Street before making a left onto Water Street to leave Petersburg and continue east through farmland. It then begins winding its way through hilly terrain to have a short concurrency with US 231/SR 10 along the Lincoln-Moore county line. The highway then crosses fully into Moore County and winds its way east through hills before entering Lynchburg and coming to an end at an intersection with SR 55 in the southern part of town. The entire route of SR 129 is a two-lane rural highway.

Major intersections

References

129
Transportation in Giles County, Tennessee
Transportation in Marshall County, Tennessee
Transportation in Moore County, Tennessee
Lynchburg, Tennessee